Kwak Ok-chol (born 6 February 1973) is a North Korean former judoka who competed in the 2000 Summer Olympics.

References

1973 births
Living people
North Korean male judoka
Olympic judoka of North Korea
Judoka at the 2000 Summer Olympics
Asian Games medalists in judo
Judoka at the 1998 Asian Games
Asian Games silver medalists for North Korea
Medalists at the 1998 Asian Games
20th-century North Korean people